Frank Zappa Meets the Mothers of Prevention is a 1985 album by Frank Zappa. The album was originally released in two slightly different versions in the US and Europe.

The album's title is a reference to  the lobby group, the PMRC, who were campaigning to require record companies to put warning stickers on albums they considered offensive, and to Zappa's former band, the Mothers of Invention.

Release 
Following distribution problems with Zappa's album Thing-Fish, which former Barking Pumpkin distributor MCA Records refused to distribute, Zappa made a deal with EMI Records, which would allow Them or Us and Thing-Fish to be distributed by Capitol Records in the United States.

Zappa wrote a "warning" which appeared on the inner sleeves of these albums, as well as Frank Zappa Meets the Mothers of Prevention, it read:WARNING/GUARANTEE:This album contains material which a truly free society would neither fear nor suppress.In some socially retarded areas, religious fanatics and ultra-conservative political organizations violate your First Amendment Rights by attempting to censor rock & roll albums. We feel that this is un-Constitutional and un-American.As an alternative to these government-supported programs (designed to keep you docile and ignorant). Barking Pumpkin is pleased to provide stimulating digital audio entertainment for those of you who have outgrown the ordinary.The language and concepts contained herein are GUARANTEED NOT TO CAUSE ETERNAL TORMENT IN THE PLACE WHERE THE GUY WITH THE HORNS AND POINTED STICK CONDUCTS HIS BUSINESS. This guarantee is as real as the threats of the video fundamentalists who use attacks on rock music in their attempt to transform America into a nation of check-mailing nincompoops (in the name of Jesus Christ).If there is a hell, its fires wait for them, not us.

The liner notes also contained a quote from Senator Ernest Hollings, who testified during the PMRC hearings: "…if I could find some way constitutionally to do away with it [foul language in music], I would", as well as Zappa's oft-repeated liner notes request for his fans to register to vote.

The original US version of the album contains the track "Porn Wars" – a sound collage featuring excerpts from PMRC hearings. This track was omitted from non-US versions, and replaced with three other pieces: "I Don't Even Care", co-written by Zappa and Johnny "Guitar" Watson, and two instrumental tracks – "One Man, One Vote" (a Synclavier composition) and "H.R. 2911", which collates some of the backing music from "Porn Wars", without the PMRC hearing excerpts and other dialogue. The initial EMI CDs only included the European Version. The original Rykodisc CDs added two of the three European tracks and shuffled around the running order. The 1995 Rykodisc remaster added the third European track after the same shuffled order.

Track listing
All tracks written by Frank Zappa, except where noted.

Personnel
Frank Zappa – vocals, guitar, Synclavier, producer
Johnny "Guitar" Watson – vocals, guitar on "I Don't Even Care"
Ike Willis – vocals, guitar
Ray White – vocals, guitar
Bobby Martin – vocals, keyboards
Steve Vai – guitar
Tommy Mars – keyboards
Scott Thunes – bass
Chad Wackerman – drums
Ed Mann – percussion
Moon Zappa – vocals
Dweezil Zappa – vocals
John Danforth – voice excerpts on "Porn Wars"
Ernest Hollings – voice excerpts on "Porn Wars"
Paul S. Trible, Jr. – voice excerpts on "Porn Wars"
Paula Hawkins – voice excerpts on "Porn Wars"
J. James Exon – voice excerpts on "Porn Wars"
Al Gore – voice excerpts on "Porn Wars"
Tipper Gore – voice excerpts on "Porn Wars"
Bob Stone – engineer

Charts
Album - Billboard (United States)

References

External links
Release details

1985 albums
Albums produced by Frank Zappa
Barking Pumpkin Records albums
Censorship of music
Frank Zappa albums